Matt Daniels (born 1989) is an American football player.

Matt Daniels may also refer to: 

 Matthew Daniels, founder of Alliance for Marriage
 Matt Daniels, band member of Shallow Side
 Lieutenant Matt Daniels, a fictional character in The Hunt for Eagle One
 Matt Daniels, a fictional character in the British TV series Sugar Rush